The southern ribbon snake (Thamnophis saurita sackenii), also known commonly as the peninsula ribbon snake and the Florida ribbon snake, is a subspecies of garter snake in the family Colubridae. It is one of four subspecies of the ribbon snake (Thamnophis saurita).

Etymology
The subspecific name, sackenii, is in honor of Russian entomologist Carl Robert Romanovich von der Osten-Sacken.

Geographic range

Description
T. saurita sackenii is smaller than the other three other subspecies of T. saurita. The dorsal color is greenish olive, or blackish in old specimens. It has a dorsal stripe that is vetiver green or light olive-gray bordered on either side with black, and the lateral stripes are marguerite yellow.

Habitat and behavior
The southern ribbon snake is found in marshes, lakes, ponds, and shores of streams. It is semi-aquatic and semi-arboreal with wet meadows and thicket a favorite habitat.

Reproduction
T. s. sackenii is ovoviviparous. Litter size is small, numbering only 5-12 newborns.

References

Further reading
Behler JL, King FW (1979). The Audubon Society Field Guide to North American Reptiles and Amphibians. New York: Alfred A. Knopf. 743 pp., 657 color plates. . (Thamnophis sauritus sackeni, p. 673).
Conant R (1975). A Field Guide to Reptiles and Amphibians of Eastern and Central North America, Second Edition. Boston: Houghton Mifflin Company. xviii + 429 pp. + Plates 1-48.  (hardcover),  (paperback). (Thamnophis sauritus sackeni, pp. 164–165 + Plate 23).
Kennicott R (1859). "Notes on Coluber calligaster of Say, and a description of new species of Serpents in the collection of the North Western University of Evanston, Ill." Proceedings of the Academy of Natural Sciences of Philadelphia 11: 98-100. (Eutænia sackenii, new species, p. 98). 
Schmidt KP, Davis DD (1941). Field Book of Snakes of the United States and Canada. New York: G.P. Putnam's Sons. 365 pp., 34 plates, 103 figures. (Thamnophis sauritus sackeni, pp. 255–256).
Smith HM, Brodie ED Jr (1982). Reptiles of North America: A Guide to Field Identification. New York: Golden Press. 240 pp.  (hardcover),  (paperback). (Thamnophis sauritus sackeni, p. 144).
Wright AH, Wright AA (1957). Handbook of Snakes of the United States and Canada. Ithaca and London: Comstock Publishing Associates, a Division of Cornell University Press. 1,105 pp. (in 2 volumes). (Thamnophis sauritus sackeni, pp. 831–834, Figure 241 + Map 59 on p. 767).

Snake, Northern Ribbon
Snake, Southern Ribbon